Khalan Laborn (born June 1, 1999) is an American football running back for the Marshall Thundering Herd.

Early years
Laborn played high school football at Bishop Sullivan Catholic High School in Virginia Beach, Virginia. He was a five-star recruit in the 2017 college football recruiting class, rated as the No. 1 all-purpose back in the country by 247Sports and Rivals.com.

College football

Florida State
Laborn enrolled at Florida State University in 2017 and redshirted that fall. He sustained a season-ending knee injury in the second game of the 2018 season. As a redshirt sophomore in 2019, he rushed for 297 yards on 63 carries. He also tallied 10 receptions for 66 yards. He was dismissed from the Florida State program in 2020 for a violation of team rules. He returned to Florida State to complete his degree without playing football.

Marshall
With college-football eligibility remaining, Laborn enrolled at Marshall in the fall of 2022. He has rushed for over 100 yards in every game during the 2022 season: 102 rushing yards against Norfolk State; 163 yards in Marshall's upset victory over No. 8 Notre Dame; 157 yards against Bowling Green; 113 yards against Troy; 191 yards against Gardner-Webb; 120 yards against Louisiana; and 150 yards against James Madison. Through games played on November 19, 2022, he ranked tenth nationally with 1,323 rushing yards.

References

External links
 Marshall profile

Year of birth missing (living people)
Living people
American football running backs
Florida State Seminoles football players
Marshall Thundering Herd football players
Sportspeople from Virginia Beach, Virginia
Players of American football from Virginia